Terry Bright (born 12 February 1958) is a former Australian rules footballer who played for Geelong in the VFL.

After winning a premiership with Geelong West in 1975 he was recruited by the Cats with whom played 219 VFL games. He was used as a forward but was sometimes seen across half back. He later coached the Geelong Falcons to the inaugural premiership in the VSFL Under-18 competition (later TAC Cup) in 1992.

References

External links

1958 births
Australian rules footballers from Victoria (Australia)
Geelong Football Club players
Geelong West Football Club players
Living people